James McVeigh (born 2 July 1949) is an English former professional footballer. He played for Wolverhampton Wanderers and Gillingham between 1968 and 1972.

References

External links 
Jimmy McVeigh, Post War English & Scottish Football League A - Z Player's Transfer Database

1949 births
Living people
Association football defenders
English footballers
Gillingham F.C. players
Wolverhampton Wanderers F.C. players
Maidstone United F.C. (1897) players
Canterbury City F.C. players
Ebbsfleet United F.C. players
English Football League players